Bob Bryan and Mike Bryan were the defending champions, but lost in the second round to Mariusz Fyrstenberg and Marcin Matkowski.

Jonas Björkman and Kevin Ullyett won in the final 6–2, 6–2, against Jeff Coetzee and Wesley Moodie.

Seeds
All seeds receive a bye into the second round.

Draw

Finals

Top half

Bottom half

External links
Draw

Doubles